The Hawke ministry was the 22nd ministry of the Government of Western Australia, led by Labor Premier Albert Hawke and deputy John Tonkin. It commenced on 23 February 1953, nine days after the McLarty–Watts Ministry, led by Premier Ross McLarty of the Liberal Party, was defeated at the 1953 election. The ministry was followed by the Brand–Watts Ministry on 2 April 1959 after the Labor Party lost government at the state election held on 21 March.

First ministry

On 23 February 1953, the Governor, Sir Charles Gairdner, constituted the ministry. He designated 10 principal executive offices of the Government and appointed the following ministers to their positions, who served until the reconstitution of the Ministry following the 1956 state election.

The list below is ordered by decreasing seniority within the Cabinet, as indicated by the Government Gazette and the Hansard index. The members of the ministry were:

Second ministry

On 20 April 1956, the Governor, Sir Charles Gairdner, reconstituted the ministry. He designated 10 principal executive offices of the Government and appointed the following ministers to their positions, who served until the end of the ministry. During the term, Ernest Hoar was appointed Agent-General for Western Australia in London, and Gilbert Fraser died on 1 November 1958.

The list below is ordered by decreasing seniority within the Cabinet, as indicated by the Government Gazette and the Hansard index. The members of the ministry were:

References

Western Australian ministries
Australian Labor Party ministries in Western Australia
Ministries of Elizabeth II